Hockey Clermont Communaute Auvergne is an ice hockey team in Clermont-Ferrand, France. They currently play in FFHG Division 2, the third level of French ice hockey. The club previously played in the Ligue Magnus under the name Sangliers Arvernes.

External links
Club profile on eurohockey.com

Ice hockey teams in France